These are the results of the women's +72 kg (also known as heavyweight) competition in judo at the 1996 Summer Olympics in Atlanta, Georgia.  A total of 20 women competed in this event, limited to jūdōka whose body weight was more than 72 kilograms. Competition took place on July 20 of 1996 in the Georgia World Congress Center.

Two single-elimination pools, with winner of each pool advanced to the final. All judoka losing to the finalists in each pool advanced to repêchage pools, with the winners of the repêchage pools earning bronze medals.

Results
The gold and silver medalists were determined by the final match of the main single-elimination bracket.

Repechage
The losing semifinalists as well as those judoka eliminated in earlier rounds by the four semifinalists of the main bracket advanced to the repechage.  These matches determined the two bronze medalists for the event.

References

External links
 

W73
Judo at the Summer Olympics Women's Heavyweight
Olympics W73
Judo